Matthew MacKay (born 5 August 1981 in Summerside) is a Canadian politician, who was elected to the Legislative Assembly of Prince Edward Island in the 2015 provincial election. He represents the electoral district of Kensington-Malpeque as a member of the Progressive Conservative Party.

On May 9, 2019, MacKay was appointed to the Executive Council of Prince Edward Island as Minister of Economic Growth, Tourism and Culture, and Minister responsible for Greater Summerside.

Prior to his election to the legislature, MacKay was also a real estate agent in Summerside for Century 21.

Electoral record

References

Living people
Canadian real estate agents
People from Queens County, Prince Edward Island
Progressive Conservative Party of Prince Edward Island MLAs
Members of the Executive Council of Prince Edward Island
21st-century Canadian politicians
1981 births